The 2020–21 Evansville Purple Aces men's basketball team represented the University of Evansville in the 2020–21 NCAA Division I men's basketball season. The Purple Aces were led by head coach Todd Lickliter in his first full season at Evansville and played their home games at the Ford Center as members of the Missouri Valley Conference (MVC). In a season limited due to the ongoing COVID-19 pandemic, they finished the season 9–16, 7–11 in MVC play to finish in a three-way tie for fifth place. As the No. 5 seed in the MVC tournament, they lost to Indiana State in the quarterfinals.

Previous season
The Purple Aces finished the 2019–20 season 9–23, 0–18 in MVC play to finish in last place. They lost in the first round of the MVC tournament to Valparaiso.

They were coached by Walter McCarty until he was placed on administrative leave on December 27 for alleged Title IX violations and ultimately fired on January 21. Assistant coach Bennie Seltzer acted as interim coach until Todd Lickliter was hired as the new head coach.

Preseason 
In the conference's preseason poll, Evansville was picked to finish last in the MVC.

Roster

Schedule and results

|-
!colspan=9 style=| Non-conference regular season

|-
!colspan=9 style=| Missouri Valley Conference regular season

|-
!colspan=12 style=| MVC tournament

References

Evansville Purple Aces men's basketball seasons
Evansville
Evansville
Evansville